Laguna del Laja National Park is a national park of Chile located in the Andes, between 37°22’ and 37°28’ south latitude and 71°16’ and 71°26’ west longitude.

Geography
The park features spectacular mountain landscapes, whose main attractions are the Antuco Volcano, Sierra Velluda and Laguna del Laja (Laja Lake). The latter gives the name to this protected area, but it only borders the park. The park ranges in elevation from 976 m to 3585 m at Sierra Velluda. Although a little snow caps Antuco volcano, much more snow adorns the two major summits of its southern neighbor, even during Chile’s summer. Sharp ridges and deep valleys carve this rugged region, which alternates between bare rock and lush vegetation. Another summit in the park, although least prominent, is Cerro Cóndor at 1,668 m.

The park forms part of the Bío Bío River basin. Some small tributaries of Laja River originate in the park.

Biology
The park lies within the Valdivian temperate forests ecoregion.

It is home to a wide variety of wildlife, including the cougar and foxes (particularly the chilla and the culpeo). In the park have been identified 47 bird species.

Endangered and rare vegetation species are found in the park. Among them are: ciprés de la cordillera, araucaria, maitén del Chubut and radal enano.

Tourism
Several activities can be performed within the boundaries of the park and in the surrounding area including climbing, trekking, skiing and fishing.

References

Protected areas established in 1958
Protected areas of Biobío Region
National parks of Chile